The citizens of Poland have the highest count of individuals who have been recognized by Yad Vashem as the Polish Righteous Among the Nations, for saving Jews from extermination during the Holocaust in World War II. There are  Polish men and women conferred with the honor, over a quarter of the  recognized by Yad Vashem in total.  The list of Righteous is not comprehensive and it is estimated that hundreds of thousands of Poles concealed and aided tens of thousands of their Polish-Jewish neighbors. Many of these initiatives were carried out by individuals, but there also existed organized networks of Polish resistance which were dedicated to aiding Jews – most notably, the Żegota organization.

In German-occupied Poland, the task of rescuing Jews was difficult and dangerous. All household members were subject to capital punishment if a Jew was found concealed in their home or on their property.

Activities

Before World War II, Poland's Jewish community had numbered about 3,460,000 – about 9.7 percent of the country's total population. Following the invasion of Poland, Germany's Nazi regime sent millions of deportees from every European country to the concentration and forced-labor camps set up in the General Government territory of occupied Poland and across the Polish areas annexed by Nazi Germany. Most Jews were imprisoned in the Nazi ghettos, which they were forbidden to leave. Soon after the German–Soviet war had broken out in 1941, the Germans began their extermination of Polish Jews on either side of the Curzon Line, parallel to the ethnic cleansing of the Polish population including Romani and other minorities of Poland.

As it became apparent that, not only were conditions in the ghettos terrible (hunger, diseases, executions), but that the Jews were being singled out for extermination at the Nazi death camps, they increasingly tried to escape from the ghettos and hide in order to survive the war. Many Polish Gentiles concealed tens of thousands of their Jewish neighbors. Many of these efforts arose spontaneously from individual initiatives, but there were also organized networks dedicated to aiding the Jews.

Most notably, in September 1942 a Provisional Committee to Aid Jews (Tymczasowy Komitet Pomocy Żydom) was founded on the initiative of Polish novelist Zofia Kossak-Szczucka, of the famous artistic and literary Kossak family. This body soon became the Council for Aid to Jews (Rada Pomocy Żydom), known by the codename Żegota, with Julian Grobelny as its president and Irena Sendler as head of its children's section.

It is not exactly known how many Jews were helped by Żegota, but at one point in 1943 it had 2,500 Jewish children under its care in Warsaw alone. At the end of the war, Sendler attempted to locate their parents but nearly all of them had been murdered at Treblinka. It is estimated that about half of the Jews who survived the war (thus over 50,000) were aided in some shape or form by Żegota.

In numerous instances, Jews were saved by entire communities, with everyone engaged, such as in the villages of Markowa and Głuchów near Łańcut, Główne, Ozorków, Borkowo near Sierpc, Dąbrowica near Ulanów, in Głupianka near Otwock, Teresin near Chełm, Rudka, Jedlanka, Makoszka, Tyśmienica, and Bójki in Parczew-Ostrów Lubelski area, and Mętów, near Głusk. Numerous families who concealed their Jewish neighbours were killed for doing so.

Risk

During the occupation of Poland (1939–1945), the Nazi German administration created hundreds of ghettos surrounded by walls and barbed-wire fences in most metropolitan cities and towns, with gentile Poles on the 'Aryan side' and the Polish Jews crammed into a fraction of the city space. On 15 October 1941, the death penalty was introduced by Hans Frank, governor of the General Government, to apply to Jews who attempted to leave the ghettos without proper authorization, and all those who "deliberately offer a hiding place to such Jews". The law was made public by posters distributed in all major cities. The death penalty was also imposed for helping Jews in other Polish territories under the German occupation, but without issuing any legal act.

Anyone from the Aryan side caught assisting those on the Jewish side in obtaining food was subject to the death penalty. The usual punishment for aiding Jews was death, applied to entire families. Polish rescuers were fully conscious of the dangers facing them and their families, not only from the invading Germans, but also from blackmailers (see: szmalcowniks) within the local, multi-ethnic population and the Volksdeutsche. The Nazis implemented a law forbidding all non-Jews from buying from Jewish shops under the maximum penalty of death.

Gunnar S. Paulsson, in his work on history of the Warsaw Jews during the Holocaust, has demonstrated that, despite the much harsher conditions, Warsaw's Polish residents managed to support and conceal the same percentage of Jews as did the residents of cities in safer countries of Western Europe, where no death penalty for saving them existed.

Numbers
There are  officially recognized Polish Righteous – the highest count among nations of the world. At a 1979 international historical conference dedicated to Holocaust rescuers, J. Friedman said in reference to Poland: "If we knew the names of all the noble people who risked their lives to save the Jews, the area around Yad Vashem would be full of trees and would turn into a forest." Hans G. Furth holds that the number of Poles who helped Jews is greatly underestimated and there might have been as many as 1,200,000 Polish rescuers.

Father John T. Pawlikowski (a Servite priest from Chicago) remarked that the hundreds of thousands of rescuers strike him as inflated.

Notable rescuers

Irena Adamowicz, liaison between several Jewish ghettos providing communication and moral support 
Wincenty Antonowicz with wife Jadwiga and daughter Lucyna, food and transport 
Ferdynand Arczyński,  took care of 4,000 Jews on the "Aryan" side of Warsaw (Zegota treasurer) 
Zofia Baniecka and her mother rescued more than 50 Jews in their Warsaw apartment in 1941–1944
Władysław Bartoszewski,  Jewish Uprising assistance (Delegatura) 
Anna Borkowska,  saved 17 young Jewish Zionists in her Vilna convent 
Franciszek and Magdalena Banasiewicz with children,  saved families of 15 in a bunker near Przemyśl
Szczepan Bradło and family,  saved three families of 16 in a dugout 
Krystyna Dańko,  hid and supplied a Jewish family of four with food, clothing and money 
Jan Dobraczyński,  placed several hundred Jewish children in Catholic convents 
Maria Fedecka,  saved 12 members of close Jewish families in Wilno
Mieczysław Fogg,  hid a Jewish family in his apartment till the end of World War II 
Andrzej Garbuliński and son,  killed for sheltering Alfenbeins family 
Antoni Gawryłkiewicz,  saved three Jewish families consisting of 16 members 
Matylda Getter,  hid 550 Jewish children from the Warsaw getto in Polish orphanages 
Zofia Glazer,  saved Cypora with her baby from the Siedlce Ghetto before massacre 
Julian Grobelny with wife Halina,  rescued a large number of Jewish children (President of Zegota) 
Irena Gut,  rescued sixteen Jews by becoming Nazi
Henryk Iwański,  arms and military support for the Jewish Uprising, (AK) 
Stefan Jagodziński,  saved Dr. Tenenwurzel's family of three  member of resistance
Stanisław Jasiński and daughter Emilia,  hid Jews who escaped the Volhynian massacres 
Jerzy and Eugenia Latoszyński,  temporarily adopting Artur Citryn 
Aleksander Kamiński,  helped organize Jewish resistance in the Warsaw Ghetto (Home Army representative) 
Jan Karski,  first reported the Holocaust to President Franklin D. Roosevelt 
Zofia Kossak-Szczucka,  helped save several thousand Jews, especially children (co-founder of Żegota) 
Maria Kotarba,  "Angel of Auschwitz" delivering food and medicine, cooking for Jewish female prisoners 
Władysław Kowalski,  hid 50 Jews around Warsaw 
Stefan Korboński
 Jerzy and Irena Krępeć saved over 30 Jews on their two rented estates near Płock 
 Jerzy Jan Lerski  (George J. Lerski), informed political circles abroad about the extermination and persecution of Jews 
Eryk Lipiński,  involved in production of forged documents for the Jews in hiding 
Wanda Makuch-Korulska
Igor Newerly,  saved Janusz Korczak's diary of martyrdom, harboured several Warsaw Ghetto journalists 
Janina Oyrzanowska-Poplewska and her sister Maria Oyrzanowska provided aid and housing to the Linfeld and Sterling families; their gardener, Jerzy Glinicki; and others, including Wiktoria Szczawińska and Franciszka Tusk (later known as Natalia Obrębka)
Tadeusz Pankiewicz,  operated the only pharmacy in the Jewish Ghetto of Kraków and distributed free medicine 
Alfreda and Bolesław Pietraszek,  rescued several Jewish families consisting of 18 people 
The Podgórski sisters: Stefania (16, now Burzminski) and Helena (6), hid 13 Jews for two and a half years in an attic in Przemyśl; Stefania married one of the rescued who later changed his name to Burzminski. Television film "Hidden in Silence" was made about this rescue mission 
Jan and Anna Puchalski  hid 6 Jews at their house for 17 months in Łosośna 
 Maria Roszak (Sister Cecylia) Dominican nun with Anna Borkowska (Sister Bertranda) sheltered Jews from Vilnius Ghetto 
Konrad Rudnicki and his mother Maria  harbored the Weintraubs family during World War II 
Irena Sendler,  helped rescue at least 2,500 Jewish children from the Warsaw Ghetto 
Henryk Sławik,  helped save over 5,000 Polish Jews in Budapest by giving them false 'arian' passports 
Jadwiga and Stanislaw Solecki, hid a Jewish girl, Marlena Wagner, at their house for at least 24 months in Korczyna
Barbara and son Jerzy Szacki,  harboured a pregnant Ghetto fugitive with a 5-year-old, helped with the newborn 
Józef and Wiktoria Ulma from Markowa,  harbored 8 Jews, killed together with them, and their own 6 children by German police 
Czesław Miłosz,  took in Tross family and supported them financially 
Rudolf Weigl,  made and supplied vaccines to two Jewish ghettos, employed Jews in hiding 
Henryk Woliński,  harbored 25 Jews in his apartment, helped 283 (AK BIP) 
Paweł Zenon Woś,  together with his parents, Paweł and Anna, smuggled 12 Jews from the Warsaw Ghetto
Jerzy Zagórski and wife Maria,  harbored 18 Jews in their home before the Warsaw Uprising 
Jan Żabiński and wife Antonina,  sheltered hundreds of displaced Jews at his Warsaw Zoo

See also
Stanisława Leszczyńska: a Polish midwife at the Auschwitz concentration camp
History of the Jews in 20th-century Poland
Holocaust in Poland
"Polish death camp" controversy

Notes

Bibliography

References
 Polish Righteous at the Museum of the History of Polish Jews
 Anna Poray,  with photographs and bibliography, 2004. List of Poles recognized as "Righteous among the Nations" by Israel's Yad Vashem (31 December 1999), with 5,400 awards including 704 of those who paid with their lives for saving Jews.
Piotr Zychowicz, Do Izraela z bohaterami: Wystawa pod Tel Awiwem pokaże, jak Polacy ratowali Żydów , Rp.pl, 18 November 2009 

 
Jewish Polish history
Poland in World War II